Slipping is a technique used in boxing that is similar to bobbing. It is considered one of the four basic defensive strategies, along with blocking, holding, and clinching. It is performed by moving the head to either side so that the opponent's punches "slip" by the boxer.

Slipping punches allows the fighter to recover quicker and counter punches faster than the opponent can reset into proper fighting stance. In boxing, timing is known to be a key factor in the outcome. Timing your slips correctly is essential in protecting yourself and saving energy. Slipping, if done incorrectly, can be dangerous as it exposes you to a counter-punch and an unbalanced stance. Which can lead to an opening for the opponent. Muhammad Ali is considered to be, pound for pound, one of the greatest fighters of all time. But what made him so lethal? Was it his power, speed, or technique of slipping punches? Many fighters and analysts will say it was his slipping capability.

How to slip punches 
There are multiple ways to slip punches in boxing, but the most basic types are slipping the inside jab, and outside jab. When slipping an outside jab, your body weight needs to be centered. And as your opponent throws the jab, rotate your body clockwise and lean slightly to your right. Which would then shift weight to the rear of your leg. Pivot both your feet in the same direction. Now you're on the outside of your opponents jab which gives the ability to counter punch over their jab. For the inside jab, as the opponent throws the jab, rotate your body counter-clockwise, lean slightly to your left putting more weight on your lead leg. It's possible to just lean without rotating, but rotating helps the movement of your guard. Raise your rear hand ready for the opponent to throw a left hook.

Common mistakes 
There are many different mistakes you can make when trying to slip a punch:
 Slipping too early
 Slipping too wide
 Slipping inside the cross
 Only moving your head
 Dropping your guard

How to master slipping 
The best method to mastering slipping is practice. Now just saying practice seems simple. But the practice needs to be with a worthy opponent. Preferably someone that is taller than you and has a longer reach. Another method is a slip bag you can hang up and move back and forth. This helps you improve movement, timing, and eye coordination while performing a slip. Repetition and patience is key to mastering slipping.

References

External links

 https://www.mightyfighter.com/how-to-slip-punches/
 https://lawofthefist.com/complete-guide-to-slipping-punches-in-boxing/

Punches (combat)
Boxing terminology
Kickboxing terminology